Jay Jay the Jet Plane is an American live-action/CGI-animated musical children's television series which aired on The Learning Channel, PBS Kids, TBN and Smile. The series aired for a total of 4 seasons and has 62 episodes. The series is centered on a group of aircraft that live in the city of Tarrytown, New York and takes place at the Tarrytown Airport. The episodes were commonly distributed in 25-minute-long (without commercials) pairs, with one header sequence and one end credit for each pair. Each episode contains one or more songs.

The theme song and many of the other songs were written by well-known children's singer/songwriter Stephen Michael Schwartz and sung by his popular musical group, Parachute Express. The series was created by David and Deborah Michel and was intended to be educational to teach life and moral lessons to children.

History

Original Series

Early episodes using physical models ('Pilot Series')
 
In late 1994, a short live-action series was produced at AMS Production Company in Dallas, Texas, with real model plane characters, and handcrafted human characters; they had the same personalities as in the later series. This original series was narrated similarly to the first twelve seasons of Thomas & Friends, or Theodore Tugboat. Three videos were released: Jay Jay's First Flight in December 1994, Old Oscar Leads the Parade in February 1995, and Tracy's Handy Hideout in October 1996. This original series was narrated by and features the voices of John William Galt. These three were known as the "pilot series".

CGI and live-action-based episodes
On November 2, 1998, the CGI-animated/live-action series premiered on The Learning Channel as part of the Ready Set Learn block. Voice actress Mary Kay Bergman provided the original voice of Jay Jay, Herky, Savannah, and Revvin' Evan. After her death, Debi Derryberry and Donna Cherry replaced her.

In 2005, new episodes were produced featuring additional characters, including the red 4-year-old Latina monoplane Lina. Each episode begins featuring a Jay Jay's Mysteries segment in which Jay Jay and Lina explore things that may be mysteries to the intended age group, such as how planes fly, and how the five senses are used. The mysteries segment is followed by a story that comes from the third season episodes of the series, so in effect, the new series repackages previously broadcast content on the subchannel networks Qubo and Smile. It aired on Channel 5 and Tiny Pop in the UK.

In 2019, Yippee TV became the exclusive streaming service of Jay Jay the Jet Plane.

Reboot

A new reboot of the series titled The New Adventures of Jay Jay the Jet Plane (originally titled The New World of Jay Jay the Jet Plane) has been confirmed through Trilogy Animation Group's website. The first trailer for the show was released in July 2022. Until the day of launching, it is still currently in development and in production. Unlike the original series, the characters' faces are completely redesigned, and made to look more cartoony, and like the original series, it will be CGI-animated.

Production
The series was produced by Venice, California-based production company Modern Cartoons at their soundstage in Oxnard, California, United States. Unlike Thomas & Friends, this series used a variety of cutting edge animation techniques:
 The backgrounds were miniature sets (usually built on two  sheets of plywood).
 The humans, including Brenda Blue, are live-action people and shot in front of a green screen.
 The planes were computer models created in PowerAnimator in Seasons 1-2 and Maya in Season 3 and Jay Jay's Mysteries. Models from the pilot series were made for reference.
 The movement of the planes was recorded by playing out the scene with wood models equipped with magnetic position sensors. The planes had a switch to aid landing and taxiing, due to some minor fluctuations in the magnetic positioning data.
 The planes' faces and lip-syncing were done by face tracking, a technique where reflective spots are put on a voice actor's face. The voice track is digitally recorded along with the spot data. Then the face is rendered using a form of parametric animation.
 Head movement and other effects were done by joysticks.

The complex mathematical and CGI issues were solved by Frank Ford Little, Ph.D.

Several proprietary software systems were used:
 Data/audio recording and smoothing were done on a Windows machine.
 Daily cuts were done on "Compaq Alpha" computers running a 64-bit version of Windows NT 4.0.

Characters

Young planes
 Jay Jay (voiced originally by Mary Kay Bergman in Seasons 1-2, then later by Debi Derryberry in Season 3 and the reboot after Bergman's death and Donna Cherry in Jay Jay's Mysteries in the CGI/live-action series) is a small blue (originally brown in some of the pilot series) jet plane who acts as a twin brother figure, and is 6 years old. He is the titular character and main protagonist of the series. His basis is greatly based on a heavily modified Airbus A318.
 Tracy (voiced by Gina Ribisi in Seasons 1-2, and later by Sandy Fox in Season 3 and the reboot Jay Jay's Mysteries in the CGI/live-action series) is a small pink jet plane who is Jay Jay's twin sister and best friend, and is 6 years old. She has normal hearing but understands American Sign Language. Like Jay Jay, Tracy's basis is greatly based on a heavily modified Airbus A318.
 Snuffy (voiced by Gina Ribisi in Seasons 1-2, and later by Sandy Fox in Season 3 and the reboot Jay Jay's Mysteries in the CGI/live-action series) is a small green, later yellow propeller-driven monoplane who is a good friend of Jay Jay and Tracy, and is 4 years old. He is equipped for skywriting. In episode consistency (which depends on the order), one episode says that he has not flown further away from Tarrytown than Lightning Bug Lake, but other episodes show him flying much further; in "Grumpy O'Malley", Snuffy still has not gotten rid of his initial shyness, but in many other episodes, he shows no sign of shyness. 
 Herky (originally voiced by Mary Kay Bergman in Seasons 1-2, and later by Debi Derryberry in Season 3 and the reboot after Bergman's death and Donna Cherry in Jay Jay's Mysteries in the CGI/live-action series) is a small (originally in some of the pilot series) yellow helicopter who is Jay Jay's friend, and is 5 years old. In the pilot series, he spoke with a stutter (like famous Looney Tunes character Porky Pig), provided by John William Galt, who voiced all the other characters. In the CGI/live-action series, he rolls his "R"s whenever he speaks. He has skids instead of wheels, and cannot taxi on the ground. He is based on the MD-902 Explorer.
 Ricky Rescue (voiced by Josh Keaton) is a yellow and red helicopter who acts as a teenage brother figure. He is known for his rescue duties. He is Herky's twin brother. Like Herky, Ricky has skids and cannot taxi on the ground.

Older planes
 Big Jake (voiced by Chuck Morgan in Seasons 1-2, then later by Michael Donovan in Season 3 in the CGI/live-action series and James Mathis III in the full CGI reboot) is a silver, later slate blue propeller-driven Lockheed Super Constellation, Lockheed Model 10 Electra plane who acts as a father figure to the young planes. In the pilot series, he seem to be based on a Boeing C-97 or a Douglas DC-7C.
 Savannah (voiced by Mary Kay Bergman in Seasons 1-2, then later by Debi Derryberry in Season 3 after Bergman's death in the CGI/live-action series and Ozioma Akagha in the full CGI reboot) is a silver, later purple supersonic airliner who acts as a mother figure. She was made at Savannah, Georgia, hence her name and Southern Belle accent. She somewhat resembles the Concorde supersonic jet. She is based on a Tupolev 444 and Tupolev 154.
 Old Oscar (voiced by Chuck Morgan in Seasons 1-2, and later by Michael Donovan in Season 3 and the reboot Jay Jay's Mysteries in the CGI/live-action series) is an old green (gray in the pilot series) biplane who knows all sorts of flying tricks and acts as a grandfather figure.

Road vehicles
 Revvin' Evan (originally voiced by Mary Kay Bergman in Seasons 1-2, and later by Debi Derryberry in Season 3 and the reboot after Bergman's death and Donna Cherry in Jay Jay's Mysteries) is a fire engine and is the cousin of Tuffy. He is based on a Tatra 815.
 Tuffy (voiced by Sandy Fox) is a confidential tow truck and is the cousin of Revvin' Evan; has a speech impediment.

Humans
 Brenda Blue (portrayed by Eve Whittle in the US version, Vanessa Stacey in the UK version of the CGI/live-action series, and later voiced by Stephanie Southerland in the full CGI reboot) is a woman in a blue jumpsuit and usually wears a red cap or a blue cap, as well as a pair of red high top Converse. She is in charge of the airport and is the airplane mechanic. She does not use the airport's control tower but communicates with the planes by a portable two-way radio from the ground.
 Miss Lee Jones is the librarian who works at the Tarrytown Public Library. She is deaf and cannot speak, as she uses sign language to do so. Tracy and Brenda are able to translate her. Despite the library being shown in some episodes, Miss Lee Jones only appeared in two episodes.
 E.Z. O'Malley (portrayed by Brian Nahas in the CGI/live-action series) is the founder of E.Z. Airlines, with cousins Grumpy O'Malley (who lives at Dewdrop Farm), Pierre O'Malley (lives in France), and Tex O'Malley (lives in Texas). (Note: here the letter 'Z' is pronounced 'zee', not 'zed'.)
 Mrs. Blue is Brenda Blue's mother, who sometimes visits Tarrytown Airport.

Animals
 Billy Bee and Bobby Bee, as their names suggest, are two bees found on Big Jake and Herky's head in "Catch the Buzz".
 The lightning bugs at Lightning Bug Lake.
 Breezy is a monarch butterfly who is good friends with Jay Jay.
 The blue whale in the ocean.

Jay Jay's Mysteries
 Lina (voiced by Ashley Whittaker) is a red propeller-driven monoplane who Old Oscar's niece from Mexico, and is 4 years old.
 Montana (voiced by Donna Cherry) is a purple propeller-driven safari plane who only appeared in two Jay Jay's Mysteries episodes alongside Lina. 
 Captain Bob is a firefighting plane.
 Peter Petey is a semi-trailer truck, makes funny jokes to his friends.
 Solar is a yellow solar-powered monoplane with 6 propellers and long, wide wings covered by solar panels on the tops of the wings.
 Truckee is a dump truck.

Episodes

Reception
Common Sense Media gave the series a four out of five stars, saying, "Parents need to know that this series offers young fans life lessons such as valuing friends, overcoming shyness, and learning to like yourself. Kids will enjoy the often funny antics of 6-year-old Jay Jay and his friends. Don't be surprised if you catch your preschooler singing along with the show's simple songs."

References

External links
 

1990s American animated television series
1990s American children's television series
1994 American television series debuts
American children's animated adventure television series
American children's animated fantasy television series
American children's animated musical television series
American computer-animated television series
American preschool education television series
American television series with live action and animation
Animated television series about children
Animated preschool education television series
1990s preschool education television series
Aviation television series
English-language television shows
Fictional aircraft
PBS Kids shows
PBS original programming
Treehouse TV original programming
TLC (TV network) original programming
American television series revived after cancellation
Qubo